Ruksana Parveen Khan (born 4 January 1981) is a Pakistani former cricketer who played as a bowler. She appeared in 5 One Day Internationals for Pakistan, all at the 1997 World Cup. She made her WODI debut against Denmark on 10 December 1997. Against South Africa, she bowled eight overs and took 2 wickets for 43 runs, her only WODI wickets.

References

External links
 
 

1981 births
Living people
Pakistani women cricketers
Pakistan women One Day International cricketers
Place of birth missing (living people)